Patrice-Edouard Ngaïssona is former minister of sports in the Central African Republic, president of the Central African Football Federation and leader of Anti-balaka, arrested in 2018 for his war crimes.

Life 
Ngaïssona was born in 1967 in Begoua. He was minister of sport under Bozize regime and president of the Central African Football Federation since 2008. In December 2013 he became leader of one of factions of Anti-balaka. In February 2018 he was elected by Executive Committee of the African Football Confederation to represent the Central African Republic. On 12 December 2018 Ngaïssona was arrested in Paris by French authorities for his involvement in war crimes pursuant to an International Criminal Court arrest warrant. On 28 November 2019 he was banned by FIFA from taking part in any football-related activity for six years and eight months. He was also fined 500,000 CHF. His trial started in February 2021.

In August 2021, at The Hague, the hearings in the Central African case of Alfred Yekatom Rhombot / Patrice-Edouard Ngaïssona resumed on Monday, August 30 after being adjourned in June. A 16th witness, placed on condition of anonymity, was questioned about the attacks in the Bossangoa region during 2013.

References 

People indicted by the International Criminal Court
1967 births
Living people
Leaders of Anti-balaka